A list of prehistoric and extant species whose fossils have been found in the London Clay, which underlies large areas of southeast England.

Plant fossils, especially seeds and fruits, are found in abundance and have been collected from the London Clay for almost 300 years. Some 350 named species of plant have been found, making the London Clay flora one of the world's most diverse for fossil seeds and fruits. The flora includes plant types found today in tropical forests of Asia and demonstrates the much warmer climate of the Eocene epoch, with plants such as Nypa (Nipah palms) and other palms being frequently encountered.  The following plants list is incomplete and is based on the research by Marjorie Chandler. and research works done by the paleobotanist Steven R. Manchester and by professor of plant palaeobiology Margaret Collinson.

Plants

Pteridophytes
Pteridaceae
Acrostichum – mangrove fern
Pteris sp. - brake
Vittaria  sp. – shoestring fern, similar to Vittaria lineata
 
Cyatheaceae – scaly tree fern
Cyathea sp. – similar to Cyathea delgadii

Thyrsopteridaceae 
Thyrsopteris sp. – similar to Thyrsopteris elegans

Osmundaceae   
Osmunda  sp. – similar to Osmunda javanica

Dryopteridaceae – wood fern, male fern
Dryopteris sp.
 
Athyriaceae
Diplazium sp. - similar to Diplazium smithianum

Onocleaceae   
Onoclea  sp. – similar to Onoclea sensibilis (the sensitive fern)

Nephrolepidaceae – macho ferns
Nephrolepis sp. 
 
Salviniaceae – water ferns
Azolla

Marsilea –  water clover
Marsilea sp. - similar to Marsilea quadrifolia

Lycopodiophytes
Lycopodiaceae – clubmosses
Lycopodium sp.
Phylloglossum  sp. – similar to Phylloglossum drummondii  (pygmy clubmoss)

Gymnosperms
Ginkgoaceae
 Ginkgo sp.

Cycadaceae
Cycas sp. - similar to Cycas schumanniana

Zamiaceae
Zamia sp. – similar to Zamia pumila

Araucariaceae – monkey puzzle, bunya pine, and Norfolk pine
Agathis sp. - similar to Agathis dammara
†Araucarites spp.
†Doliostrobus stenbergi - fossils in the past named  †Araucarites are said to be of this genus, it is now placed in its own family, †Doliostrobaceae.

Pinaceae
Pinus spp.
 
Taxaceae 
?Taxaceae indet. 
†Cephalotaxus bowerbanki – plum yew
Torreya sp.

Cupressaceae
†Callitris curta (Callitrites curta) – cypress pine
†Cupressinites spp.
Libocedrus adpressa 
†Quasisequoia sp.
Sequoia couttsiae
Widdringtonia sp. – African cypresses

Podocarpaceae
Afrocarpus sp. – similar to Afrocarpus falcatus  (common yellowwood) 
Podocarpus argillaelondinensis?
Podocarpus  sp. – similar to Podocarpus elatus (plum pine) 
Podocarpus  sp. – similar to Podocarpus novae-caledoniae
Podocarpus  sp. – similar to Podocarpus nubigenus (Chilean podocarp, cloud podocarp)
Prumnopitys  sp. – similar to Prumnopitys andina (the Chilean plum yew)

Angiosperms
Arecaceae – palms 
†Caryotispermum cantiense
Corypha sp. 
Livistona minima
Nypa burtini (syn. Nipa burtini)
Oncosperma anglica
†Palmospermum bracknellense
†Palmospermum cooperi
†Palmospermum davisi
†Palmospermum elegans
†Palmospermum jenkinsi 
†Palmospermum minutum
†Palmospermum ornatum
†Palmospermum ovale
†Palmospermum subglobulare
Sabal grandisperma
Serenoa sp.
?Trachycarpus sp.

Cyclanthaceae
Cyclanthus lakensis

Cyperaceae - sedges
†Caricoidea obovata 
†Polycarpella caespitosa

Posidoniaceae - seagrass family
Posidonia parisiensis

Nymphaeaceae – water lilies
†Protobarclaya eocenica
Victoria sp - similar to Victoria cruziana

Magnoliaceae 
Liriodendron gardneri - tulip tree
Magnolia angusta 
Magnolia crassa
Magnolia davisi
Magnolia lata
Magnolia lobata
Magnolia oblonga
Magnolia pygmaea
Magnolia rugosa
Magnolia subquadrangularis 
Magnolia symmetrica

Myristicaceae - nutmeg family
†Myristicacarpum chandlerae

Annonaceae - the custard apple family 
Alphonsea sp. 
†Anonaspermum anonijorme - related to the genera Anonna and Polyalthia, most similar species is Annona muricata
†Anonaspermum cerebellatum - Uvaria, Melodorum and Orophea shows closest resemblance to the fossil
†Anonaspermum commune 
†Anonaspermum complanatum - related to Anonna and Melodorum
†Anonaspermum corrugatum - related to the genera Anonna and Melodorum
†Anonaspermum minimum - related to Dasymaschalon clusiflorum
†Anonaspermum obscurum
†Anonaspermum ovale - related to the genera Anonna and Melodorum
†Anonaspermum pulchrum - related to Dasymaschalon clusiflorum
†Anonaspermum punctatum - related to the genera  Bocagea, Orophea, Unonopsis, and Guatteria
†Anonaspermum rotundatum - distantly related to Polyauhia
†Anonaspermum rugosum
†Anonaspermum subcompressum
Asimina sp. - similar to Asimina reticulata
Orophea sp.
Polyalthia sp.
Rollinia sp. 
Uvaria sp.

Lauraceae – avocado and cinnamon family
Beilschmiedia bognorensis
Beilschmiedia eocenica
Beilschmiedia gigantea
Beilschmiedia oviformis 
Beilschmiedia pyriformis
 
Cinnamomum grande
Cinnamomum globulare
Cinnamomum oblongum
Cinnamomum ovoideum 
 
†Crowella globosa 
 
Endiandra spp. 
 
†Laurocalyx bowerbanki 
†Laurocalyx dubius
†Laurocalyx fibrotorulosus 
†Laurocalyx globularis
†Laurocalyx magnus 
 
†Laurocarpum crassum
†Laurocarpum cupuliferum  
†Laurocarpum davisi 
†Laurocarpum inornatum 
†Laurocarpum minimum 
†Laurocarpum minutissimum 
†Laurocarpum ovoideum 
†Laurocarpum paradoxum 
†Laurocarpum proteum 
†Laurocarpum pyrocarpum 
†Laurocarpum sheppeyense

Litsea pyriformis

Ocotea sp.
 
†Protoaltingia europaea 
 
†Protoravensara sheppeyensis

Aristolochiaceae - birthwort family 
Aristolochia sp.

Schisandraceae
Illicium sp.  - similar to Illicium floridanum

Dilleniaceae
Hibbertia bognorensis 
Tetracera? cantiensis
Tetracera crofti 
Tetracera eocenica

Platanaceae – sycamore or plane tree
†Plataninium decipiens

Proteaceae
Dryandra acutiloba

Fagaceae – beech, oak and chestnut family
†Quercinium pasanioides

Betulaceae – birch, alder and hornbeams
Alnus richardsoni (syn. Petrophiloides richardsoni) – an alder

Ticodendraceae 
†Ferrignocarpus bivalvis

Myricaceae - wax-myrtle, bayberry family
Myrica boveyana

Juglandaceae – walnut, hickory and pecan family
†Juglandicarya bognorensis 
†Juglandicarya cooperi
†Juglandicarya depressa  - the most common Juglandacarya species in the London Clay 
†Juglandicarya lubbocki
†Juglandicarya minuta 
†Petrophiloides richardsoni - among the two most abundant Juglandaceae species in the London Clay
†Pterocaryopsis bognorensis - related to the genus Pterocarya

Trochodendraceae
Trochodendron pauciseminum

Haloragaceae
†Haloragicarya sp.

Sabiaceae
†Bognoria venablesi
Meliosma cantiensis
Meliosma jenkinsi
Meliosma sheppeyensis

Menispermaceae – moon seed family
†Bowerbankella tiliacoroidea 
†Davisicarpum gibbosum
Diploclisia bognorensis 
†Eohypserpa parsonsi 
†Frintonia ornata
Hypserpa sp.
Jatrorrhiza sp.
†Menispermicarpum rariforme
†Menispermoxylon  -  close to the extant genus Tinomiscium 
†Microtinomiscium foveolatum
†Palaeococculus lakensis
†Palaeosinomenium pulchrum
†Tinomiscoidea scaphiformis 
Tinospora excavata 
†Wardenia davisi

Cardiopteridaceae
Citronella sp.

Torricelliaceae
Toricellia sp. - very similar to Torricellia bonesii from the Clarno Formation of Oregon

Hamamelidaceae – witch-hazel family
Corylopsis? bognorensis
Corylopsis? latisperma
Corylopsis venablesi
†Jenkinsella sp. 
†Protoaltingia europaea

Altingiaceae
Altingia sp. 
Liquidambar palaeocenica - sweetgum

Oleaceae
Fraxinus sp.

Styracaceae
Styrax sp.

Theaceae
Camellia sp. - tea
Gordonia sp.
Stewartia sp.

Pentaphylacaceae
Eurya sp.

Symplocaceae – sapphire-berry, sweet leaf.
Symplocos curvata
Symplocos quadrilocularis 
Symplocos trilocularis 
Symplocos bognorensis

Ericaceae
?Leucopogon quadrilocularis
Lissanthe sp.
Rhododendron sp.
 
Sapotaceae 
†Sapoticarpum rotundatum
†Sapoticarpum latum
†Sapoticarpum duhium
†Sapotispermum sheppeyense - allied to Chrysophyllum and Sideroxylon

Bataceae - saltwort or beachwort
Batis sp. - similar to Batis maritima

Myrtaceae
†Hightea elliptica
†Hightea turgida
†Myrtospermum variabile
†Palaeorhodomyrtus subangulata - allied to Rhodomyrtus

Staphyleaceae
?Tapiscia sp. - bladdernut

Fabaceae
Acacia sp. – similar to Vachellia farnesiana
Caesalpinia sp. - seed pods very similar to seed pods of C. claibornensis from the middle Eocene of Tennessee
Dalbergia sp.
†Leguminocarpon gardneri - seed pods most compatible to seed pods of species in Caesalpinia and Peltogyne
†Leguminocarpon nervosum
†Mimosites browniana

Rosaceae
Rubus sp.

Elaeagnaceae
Elaeagnus sp. - oleaster, silverberry

Myrsinaceae 
Ardisia eocenica

Rhizophoraceae - mangrove
Ceriops sp.
†Palaeobruguiera elongata
†Palaeobruguiera lata

Salicaceae    
Oncoba variabilis
†Oncobella sp.
† Saxifragispermum spinosissimum

Linaceae
†Decaplatyspermum bowerbanki 
†Wetherellia variahilis - related to Hugonia

Nyctaginaceae - the four o'clock family 
Pisonia sp. - the birdcatcher tree

Olacaceae 
Erythropalum europaeum - Only one extant species of this genus which is a scandent shrubs or liana
Erythropalum jenkinsi
Erythropalum turbinatum 
Olax depressa

Lamiaceae
Satureja sp.

Boraginaceae 
Ehretia clausentia
Ehretia ehretioides
Heliotropium sp.

Solanaceae 
†Cantisolanum daturoides
Datura sp. - similar to Datura ferox
Datura sp. - similar to Datura metel

Apocynaceae - the dogbane family
Allamanda sp. 
†Ochrosella ovalis
†Ochrosoidea sheppeyensis

Burseraceae - the incense tree family 
Boswellia sp.
†Bursericarpum aldwickense
†Bursericarpum bognorense
†Bursericarpum ovale
†Bursericarpum venablesi
†Palaeobursera bognorensis 
†Protocommiphora europaea

Anacardiaceae 
Choerospondias sheppeyensis
Dracontomelon minimum
Dracontomelon subglobosum
Lannea europaea
Lannea jenkinsi 
†Lobaticarpum variabile
Mangifera sp. - mango
Odina europaea 
Odina jenkinsi 
Odina subreniformis
Poupartia sp. 
†Pseudosclerocarya subalata
†Spondiaecarpon operculatum - according to several botanists, the pyritized specimens, originally described as Spondiaecarpon operculatum, represent locule casts of Torricellia sp.
†Xylocarya sp.

Onagraceae
†Palaeeucharidium cellulare - allied to Eucharidium

Lythraceae 
†Cranmeria trilocularis  
†Minsterocarpum alatum - closely related to the crape myrtle or crepe myrtle genus Lagerstroemia
†Pachyspermum quinqueloculare 
†Tamesicarpum polyspermum

Malvaceae 
†Cantitilia polysperma
 
Elaeocarpaceae 
†Echinocarpus sheppeyensis

Moraceae – mulberry and fig family
Artocarpus sp. – breadfruit
Ficus sp. – fig
Maclura sp.
?Morus sp.

Urticaceae
†Urticicarpum scutellum

Euphorbiaceae - the spurge family
Aleurites sp.
Croton sp.
Euphorbia  sp.  –  similar to Euphorbia cotinifolia 
†Euphorbiospermum bognorense
†Euphorbiospermum cooperi 
†Euphorbiospermum eocenicum
†Euphorbiospermum obliquum 
†Euphorbiospermum subglobulare
†Euphorbiospermum subovoideum
†Euphorbiospermum venablesi 
†Euphorbiotheca minima
†Euphorbiotheca sheppeyensis
†Lagenoidea bilocularis 
†Lagenoidea trilocularis

Manihot sp. – cassava 
†Wetherellia variabilis

Cucurbitaceae - the gourd family
†Cucurbitospermum cooperi  
†Cucurbitospermum equiaelaterale  
†Cucurbitospermum sheppeyense 
†Cucurbitospermum triangulare

Vitaceae
Ampelopsis sp.
†Palaeovitis sp.
Tetrastigma corrugata 
Tetrastigma davisi 
Tetrastigma elliotti
Tetrastigma sheppeyensis:*†Vitacexoylon sp. - close to the extant genus Rhoicissus
Vitis bilobata
Vitis bognorensis
Vitis bracknellensis
Vitis elegans
Vitis longisulcata
Vitis magnisperma
Vitis obovoidea
Vitis platyformis
Vitis pygmaea
Vitis rectisulcata
Vitis semenlabruscoides
Vitis subglobosa
Vitis venablesi

Sapindaceae – soapberry
Atalaya sp. – similar to Atalaya variifolia from Australia
†Cupanoides grandis - related to Cupania
†Cupanoides tumidus - related to Cupania
†Palaeallophylus minimus
†Palaeallophyllus ovoideus
†Palaeallophylus rotundatus
†Palaealectryon spirale
†Sapindospermum cooperi 
†Sapindospermum davisi 
†Sapindospermum grande
†Sapindospermum jenkinsi
†Sapindospermum ovoideum 
†Sapindospermum revolutum
†Sapindospermum subovatum
Toechima sp.

Meliaceae - the mahogany family 
Cedrela sp.
†Melicarya variabili 
Toona sulcata

Rutaceae - the rue family
†Canticarya gracilis
†Canticarya ovalis
†Canticarya sheppeyensis
†Canticarya ventricosa
†Caxtonia elongata
†Caxtonia glandulosa
†Caxtonia rutacaeformis
†Citrispermum sheppeyense
†Clausenispermum dubium
†Eozanthoxylon glandulosum
Euodia costata
†Rutaspermum bognorense
†Rutaspermum minimum 
†Shrubsolea jenkinsi
†Zanthoxylon compression
†Zanthoxylon bognorense

Celastraceae - the staff vine or bittersweet family
†Canticarpum celastroides
Catha sp. – most similar to Catha edulis (Khat)
†Cathispermum pulchrum
†Celastrinoxylon ramunculiformis

Sterculiaceae
Dombeya sp.
†Sphinxia ovalis

Cornaceae 
†Beckettia mastixioides 
Cornus ettingshausenii
†Dunstania ettinghauseni
†Dunstania multilocularis
†Langtonia bisulcata
†Lanfrancia subglobosa
Mastixia cantiensis
Mastixia grandis
Mastixia parva
†Portnallia bognorensis
†Portnallia sheppeyensis

Nyssaceae - the tupelo family
Nyssa bilocularis 
Nyssa cooperi 
†Palaeonyssa multilocularis

Curtisiaceae
Curtisia quadrilocularis

Alangiaceae 
Alangium jenkinsi

Icacinaceae
†Faboidea crassicutis
†Icacinicarya amygadaloidea
†Icacinicarya bartonensis
†Icacinicarya becktonensis
†Icacinicarya bognorensis
†Icacinicarya echinata
†Icacinicarya elegans
†Icacinicarya emarginata
†Icacinicarya forbesii
†Icacinicarya foveolata
†Icacinicarya glabra
†Icacinicarya inornata
†Icacinicarya jenkinsi
†Icacinicarya minima
†Icacinicarya mucronata
†Icacinicarya nodulifera
†Icacinicarya ovalis
†Icacinicarya ovoidea
†Icacinicarya platycarpa
†Icacinicarya pygmaea
†Icacinicarya reticulata
†Icacinicarya rotundata
†Icacinicarya transversalis
Iodes acutiform
Iodes bilinica
Iodes corniculata
Iodes davisii
Iodes eocenica
Iodes multireticulata
Mappia sp.
Miquelia sp.
Natsiatum eocenicum
†Palaeophytocrene ambigua
†Palaeophytocrene foveolata
†Perforatocarpum echinatum
†Sphaeriodes ventricosa
†Stizocarya communis

Animals
Animal fossils include bivalves, gastropods, nautilus, worm tubes, brittle stars and starfish, crabs, lobsters, fish (including shark and ray teeth), reptiles (particularly turtles), and a large diversity of birds. A few mammal remains have also been recorded. Preservation varies; articulated skeletons are generally rare. Of fish, isolated teeth are very frequent. Bird bones are not infrequently encountered compared to other lagerstätten, but usually occur as single bones and are often broken.

The following fauna species list follows Clouter (2007).

Vertebrates

Mammals
 Argillotherium
 Coryphodon eocaenus – a pantodont
 Hyracotherium – a palaeothere
 Oxyaena – a creodont
 Platychoerops richardsoni - from Herne Bay, a primate belonging to the order Plesiadapiformes

Birds
 Anatalavis oxfordi – a waterbird possibly related to the magpie-goose of Australia
 Archaeodromus - an archaeotrogonid
 Argillipes – perhaps a landfowl
 Coturnipes – a quail-like bird
 Danielsraptor – a masillaraptorid falconiform, closely related to Masillaraptor
 Dasornis – a pseudotooth bird
 Eocolius – a coliiform
 Eostrix – an owl
 Gastornis – from the Isle of Grain, a very large flightless galloansere 
 Halcyornis – a parrot or roller relative
 Lithornis – a paleognath
 Lutavis – a possible afroavian
 Nasidytes – a loon
 Odontopteryx – a pseudotooth bird
 Parvigyps – perhaps a diurnal raptor
 Pediorallus – a paleognath or landfowl
 Percolinus – perhaps a landfowl
 "Precursor" – apparently a chimera of Charadriiformes and Psittaciformes (and possibly other) bones
 Primapus – a swift-like bird
 Primodroma – a tubenose, possibly a storm-petrel
 Promusophaga – a paleognath
 Prophaeton – a tropicbirds relative
 Proherodius – a waterbird
 Proplegadis – a stork or ibis
  Pseudodontornis – a pseudotooth bird
 Psittacomimus – a psittacopedid, closely related to Parapsittacopes
 Pulchrapollia – a parrot relative
 Stintonornis – probably a hawk relative
 Tynskya  –  a messelasturid related to passerines and parrots
 Waltonavis – a possible leptosomiform
 Ypresiglaux – a basal strigiform

ReptilesCrocodylians Diplocynodon – an alligatoroid
 Kentisuchus spenceri – a crocodylidSnakes Palaeophis toliapicus and P. typhaeusTurtles and tortoises'''
 
 Allaeochelys – a pig-nosed turtle
 Argillochelys, Eochelone, Puppigerus and "Thalassochelys" sp. – true sea-turtles
 Chrysemys bicarinata and C. testudiniformis – pond turtles
 Eosphargis – a leatherback sea-turtle
 Homopus comptoni – a tortoise
 Lytoloma crassicostatum and L. planimentum – prehistoric sea-turtles
 Palemys bowerbanki – a bothremydid
 Trionyx pustulatus and T. sp. – softshell turtles
 Dacochelys and Pseudotrionyx – incertae sedisBony fish
 Acestrus elongatus, A. ornatus, Aglyptorhynchus sulcatus, A. venablasi, Xiphiorhynchus parvus and X priscus – swordfish relatives
 Acipenser toliapicus – a true sturgeon
 Albula oweni – a bonefish
 Ampheristus toliapicus – a scorpionfish
 Ardiodus marriotti – incertae sedis Argillichthys toombsi – a lizardfish relative
 Aulopopsis depressifrons, A. egertoni and	Labrophagus esocinus – flagfins
 Beerichthys ingens and B. sp. – Two species of luvar or luvar-like fish	
 Bramoides brieni and Goniocranion arambourgi – pomfrets
 Brychaetus muelleri – an arowana	
 Bucklandium diluvii – a naked catfish	
 Cylindracanthus rectus and Hemirhabdorhynchus elliotti – Blochiidae
 Cymbium proosti, Eocoelopoma colei, E. curvatum, E. gigas, E. hopwoodi, Eothynnus salmoneus, Scombramphodon crassidens, S. sheppeyensis, Scombrinus macropomus, S. nuchalis, Sphyraenodus priscus, Tamesichthys decipiens, Wetherellus brevior, W. cristatus, W. longior and Woodwardella patellifrons – mackerel and tuna relatives
 Diodon sp. – a porcupinefish
 Egertonia isodonta and Phyllodus toliapicus – Phyllodontidae
 Elops sp., Esocelops cavifrons, Megalops oblongus, M. priscus, Promegalops sheppeyensis and P. signeuxae – ladyfish	
 Enniskillenus radiatus – acanthomorph
 Eutrichurides winkleri – a cutlassfish	
 Halecopsis insignis – Halecopsidae	
 Laparon alticeps and Whitephippus tamesis – spadefish	
 Lehmanamia sheppeyensis – a bowfin
 Myripristis toliapicus, Naupygus bucklandi and Paraberyx bowerbanki – soldierfish	
 Percostoma angustum, Plesioserranus cf. wemmeliensi and Serranopsis londinensis – groupers	
 Podocephalus curryi, P. nitidus, Sciaenuropsis turneri and Sciaenurus bowerbanki – porgies	
 Progempylus edwardsi – a snake mackerel	
 Pseudosphaerodon antiquus and P. navicularis – wrasses?
 Pycnodus bowerbanki and P. toliapicus – Pychnodontidae
 Rhinocephalus planiceps and Trichurides sagittidens – hakes	
 Rhynchorhinus branchialis and R. major – Eccelidae	
 Tetratichthys antiquitatis – a jack mackerel

Cartilaginous fish
 Abdounia beaugi, Carcharhinus sp. and Physogaleus secundus – requiem sharks
 Aetobatis irregularis, Burnhamia daviesi, Myliobatis dixoni, M. latidens, M. raouxi and M. toliapicus – eagle rays	
 Anomotodon sheppeyensis – a goblin shark	
 Carcharias hopei, Jaekelotodus trigonalis, Odontaspis winkleri, Palaeohypotodus rutoti and Striatolamia macrota – sand sharks
 Edaphodon bucklandi and Elasmodus hunteri – chimaeras
 Dasyatis davisi and D. wochadunensis – stingrays
 Galeorhinus lefevrei, G. minor, G. recticonus, G. ypresiensis, Mustelus whitei and Triakis wardi – hound sharks	
 Heterodontus vincenti, H. wardenensis and H. woodwardi – bullhead sharks
 Hexanchus agassizi, H. collinsonae, H. hookeri, Notorhynchus serratissimus and Weltonia burnhamensis – cow sharks	
 Isisteus trituratus and Squalus minor – dogfish sharks
 Isurolamna affinis, Isurus nova, I. praecursor, Lamna inflata, L. lerichei, Otodus obliquus, O. aksuaticus and Xiphodolamia eocaena – white sharks
 Megascyliorhinus cooperi, Scyliorhinus casieri, S. gilberti, S. pattersoni and S. woodwardi – catsharks	
 Pararhincodon sp? – an indeterminate shark
 Raja sp.?  – an indeterminate ray
 Squatina prima – an angel shark

Crustaceans

Lobsters and shrimp
 Archiocarabus bowerbankiCallianassa sp.Homarus morrisi Hoploparia gammaroidesLinuparus eocenicus & L. scyllariformisScyllarides tuberculatusScyllaridia koenigiThenops scyllariformisBarnaclesArcoscapellum quadratumScalpellum minutum and S. quadratumCrabsBasinotopus lamarckii Desmarest Campylostoma mutatiformeCyclocorystes pulchellusDromilites bucklandi & D. lamarkiGlyphthyreus wetherelliGoniochela angulata Desmarest Harpactoxanthopsis cf. quadriloMithracia libinioidesOediosoma ambiguaPortunites incerta & P. stintoniXanthilites bowerbankiZanthopsis bispinosa, Z. dufori, Z. leachei, Z. nodosa and Z. unispinosaMantis shrimp
 Squilla wetherelliMolluscs

Cephalopods
 Aturia ziczac, Cimomia imperialis, Deltoidonautilus sowerbyi, Euciphoceras regale, Eutrephoceras urbanum, Hercoglossa cassiniana and Simplicioceras centrale – nautiluses
 Belopterina levesquei, Belosepia blainvillei and B. sepioidea – cuttlefish

Bivalves
 Abra splendens – Semelidae	
 Amygdalum depressum and Modiolus tubicola – Mytilidae
Anomiidae
 Anomia scabrosa – a jingle shell	
 Enigmonia aenigmatica – a jingle shell
 Arca nitens, A. tumescens and Glycymeris wrigleyi – ark clams
 Arctica planata – Arcticidae
 Astarte davisi, A. filigera and A. rugata – 
Astartidae	
 Calpitaria sulcataria – a venus clam
 Corbula globosa – Corbulidae
 Cuspidaria inflata and C. lamallosa – Cuspidariidae
 Nuculana amygdaloides and N. prisca – Nuculanidae
 Lentipecten corneus and Pecten sp. – scallops
 Nemocardium nitens and N. semigranulatum – Cardiidae
 Nucula consors – Nuculidae	
 Ostrea sp. – a true oysters	
 Pinna affinis – a pen shell
 Pleurolectroma media and Pteria papyracea – pearl oysters
 Pycnodonte gryphovicina – Pycnodontidae
 Teredina personata and Teredo sp. – shipworms
 Thyasira angulata   – Thyasiridae	
 Thyasira goodhali – Thyasiridae	
 Venericardia trinobantium – Carditidae	
 Verticordia sulcata – Verticordiidae

Gastropods
 Acrilla cymaea, Foratiscala perforata, Litoriniscala scalaroides and Undiscala primaeva – wentletraps
 Aporrhais sowerbii and Eotibia lucida – true conchs
 Bathytoma granata, B. turbida, Clavatula conica, Cochlespira gyrata, Conolithus concinnus, Endiatoma cerithiformis, Fusiturris selysi, F. simillima, F. wetherelli, Gemmula koninckii, Hemipleurotoma fasciolata, H. prestwichi, Pseudotoma topleyi, Surculites errans, S. velatus, Turricula crassa, T. helix, T. latimarginata, T. nanodis, T. symmetrica and T. teretrium – Conoidea
 Bonellitia clathratum and B. laeviuscula – nutmeg shells
 Bullinella sp., Crenilabium elongatum, ?Roxiana sp., Scaphander ?parisiensis and Tornatellaea simulata – opisthobranchs
 Camptoceratops prisca, Spiratella mercinensis, S. taylori and S. tutelina – sea-butterflies
 Cassis striata and Mambrina gallica – tun shells
 Cepatia cepacea, Daphnobela juncea, Litiopa sulculosa, Orthochetus elongatus and Stellaxis pulcher – incertae sedis Eocypraea oviformis – a cowrie
 Euspira glaucinoides and Sinum clathratum – moon snails
 Falsifusus londini, Fusinus coniferus, F. wetherelli, Pseudoneptunea curta, Siphonalia highgatensis, Streptolathyrus triliniatus, S. zonulatus, Wrigleya complanata and W. transversaria – true whelks
 Ficopsis multiformis – a fig shell	
 Lacunella sp. – a periwinkle
 Mathilda sororcula	– Mathildidae
 Murex subcristatus and Paziella argillacea – murex snails
 Pachysyrnola sp. and Turbonilla subterranea – pyramid shells
 Patella sp. – Patellidae
 Ptychatractus aff. interuptus, Scaphella wetherelli and Volutospina nodosa – volutes
 Rilla cf. tenuistriata – Streptaxidae
 Ringicula turgida – Ringiculidae
 Sassia morrisi – a triton shell
 Sigapatella sp. – Calyptraeidae
 Tornus sp. and Turboella cf. misera – Rissoidae
 Xenophora extensum – a carrier shell

Tusk shells
 Antalis anceps and A. nitensEchinoderms

 Asteropecten crispatus, Coulonia colei, Hemiaster bowerbanki, Hippasteria tuberculata, Ophioglypha wetherelli and Teichaster stokesii – starfish
 Coelopleurus wetherelli, Micraster sp. and Schizaster sp. – sea urchins
 Democrinus londinensis – crinoid
 ?Ophiacantha sp., Ophioglypha wetherelli, Ophiomusium sp. and Ophiura wetherelli – brittlestars

Annelids
 Rotularia bognoriensis 
 Serpula trilineataCnidarians
 Paracyathus brevis and P. caryophyllus – corals
 Graphularia wetherelli – hydrozoan

Other invertebrates
 Adenellopsis wetherelli, Aimulosia sp., Batopora clithridiata, Beisselina sp., Cribrilina sp., Didymosella sp., Dittosaria wetherelli, Entalophora sp., Idmonia sp., Lunulites sp., Nellia sp., Pachythecella incisa, Vibracellina sp. and Websteria crissioides – bryozoans
 Hemiptera gen. et sp. indet. – true bug
 Lingula tenuis, Terebratulina striatula and T. wardenensis – lampshells
 Stelleta sp. – sponge

Ichnofossils
 Ditrupa plana – polychaete worm tubes?
 Scolithos''

Notes

References

London-related lists
Paleogene United Kingdom
Paleogene life
Paleogene plants
Lists of prehistoric animals
London Clay species